Xanthaciura flavicauda is a species of tephritid or fruit flies in the genus Xanthaciura of the family Tephritidae.

Distribution
Nicaragua to Panama, Guyana, Trinidad.

References

Tephritinae
Insects described in 1953
Diptera of South America
Diptera of North America